William Jarvis may refer to:
 William H. Jarvis (1930–2016), member of the Canadian House of Commons
 William T. Jarvis (1935–2016), health educator and skeptic
 William Jarvis (Upper Canada official) (1756–1817), militia officer and official in Upper Canada
 William Botsford Jarvis (1799–1864), Upper Canada political figure associated with the Rosedale and Yorkville neighbourhoods of Toronto
 William Jarvis (merchant) (1770–1859), American diplomat and sheep rancher
William Jarvis (Australian politician) (1871–1939), member of the Tasmanian Parliament
 William Jarvis (rower), Australian rower at the 1924 Olympics
 William Dummer Jarvis (1834-1914), first commissioned officer in the North-West Mounted Police
William Esmond Jarvis, former Canadian High Commissioner to New Zealand
Will Jarvis (footballer) (born 2002), English footballer